The term Chicago piano has been used as a nickname for a number of weapons:
Thompson submachine gun
1.1-inch anti-aircraft gun
Multiple 2-pdr pom pom anti-aircraft gun